Eileen Pollack (born 1956) is an American novelist, essayist, and short story writer. She is the former director of the Master of Fine Arts Program at the University of Michigan. Pollack holds an undergraduate degree in Physics from Yale University and an M.F.A in creative writing from the University of Iowa. She received the Rona Jaffe Foundation Writers' Award in 1996.

She currently divides her time between Ann Arbor, Michigan, and Manhattan.

Pollack's The Rabbi in the Attic and Other Stories (1991) features an Old-World male rabbi and his leftist female successor, and is among the early works of American Jewish literature to prominently feature the inclusion of women rabbis as literary figures.

Works
 The Rabbi in the Attic
 Paradise, New York
 "In the Mouth"
 "Woman Walking Ahead: In Search of Catherine Weldon and Sitting Bull"
 Breaking and Entering
 The Only Woman in the Room: Why Science Is Still a Boys' Club
 A Perfect Life

References

External links
Official website
Brown University Interview

"Why Are There Still So Few Women in Science?" in The New York Times Magazine, 2013
"What Really Keeps Women Out of Tech" in The New York Times, 2015

21st-century American novelists
American women novelists
American women short story writers
1956 births
Living people
Yale University alumni
University of Iowa alumni
American women essayists
21st-century American women writers
University of Michigan faculty
Rona Jaffe Foundation Writers' Award winners
21st-century American short story writers
21st-century American essayists
20th-century American novelists
20th-century American women writers
Novelists from Michigan
20th-century American non-fiction writers
American women academics